Büren District was a district in the canton of Bern in Switzerland, with its capital at Büren an der Aare. It contained 14 municipalities in an area of 88 km²:

External links

Former districts of the canton of Bern